Carmen Florentina Cartaș (born 9 May 1985) is a Romanian team handball player who plays as a left back for Corona Brașov. She participated at the 2011 World Women's Handball Championship in Brazil.

Individual awards
 Romanian Liga Naţională: 2011, 2014

References

Sportspeople from Constanța
1985 births
Living people
Romanian female handball players